Mesa Amphitheatre is an outdoor concert venue with lawn seating located in Mesa, Arizona. It opened in 1979 and has a maximum capacity of 4,950 people.

The amphitheatre has kept its original design since opening and has become a popular destination for small and big acts alike.

Located in central Mesa, it has a tiered lawn large enough to attract popular events, yet intimate enough for everyone to have a good view of the stage.

Concerts

See also
 List of contemporary amphitheaters

References

External links
Official website

Amphitheaters in the United States
Music venues in Arizona
Buildings and structures in Mesa, Arizona
Tourist attractions in Maricopa County, Arizona
Event venues established in 1979
Music venues completed in 1979
1979 establishments in Arizona